Deinze is a city and a municipality in the Belgian province of East Flanders. It comprises the city of Deinze, and the towns of Astene, Bachte-Maria-Leerne, Gottem, Grammene, Hansbeke, Landegem, Meigem, Merendree, Nevele, Petegem-aan-de-Leie, Sint-Martens-Leerne, Vinkt, Vosselare, Wontergem, and Zeveren. On 1 January 2022, Deinze had a population of 44,315.

On 1 January 2019, the municipality of Nevele was merged into Deinze.

History

In 1695, during the Nine Years' War, an English force garrisoned in the town under the command of the Irish general Francis Fergus O’Farrell was forced to surrender to French forces.

Postal history
The DEYNZE post office opened in 1836 with the postal code 31 (before 1864), then 94 prior to 1874. The only other office in the area before 1910 was PETEGHEM (not to be confused with PETEGHEM-LEZ-AUDENAERDE), which opened 1 June 1874.

Postal codes in 1969 (before the merger of municipalities in 1977):

 9800 Deinze
 9801 Astene
 9802 Petegem-aan-de-Leie
 9803 Gottem
 9804 Grammene
 9805 Wontergem
 9806 Vinkt
 9807 Zeveren
 9852 Sint-Martens-Leerne
 9853 Bachte-Maria-Leerne
 9854 Meigem

Sports
Deinze is the starting location of the cycling race Gent–Wevelgem. It is also the operational base of the Ineos Grenadiers cycle racing team, formally Team Sky.

Places of interest
 Museum van Deinze en de Leiestreek, a museum dedicated to arts and folk objects created in the Leie region
 Ooidonk Castle, a castle dating from the 16th century

Famous inhabitants
 Dirk van Braeckel, head of design at Bentley Motors
Karel Justinus Calewaert, Roman Catholic bishop
 Raoul De Keyser, painter
 Rudy Dhaenens, cyclist, World Champion in 1990
 Poppo of Deinze, saint
 Jacques Rogge, president of the International Olympic Committee
 Charles Felix Van Quickenborne, founder of Saint Louis University in St. Louis, Mo., USA
 Karel Van Wijnendaele, founder of the Tour of Flanders
 Tanneke Sconyncx, alleged witch
 Rose Bertram, fashion model

Gallery

References

External links

Deinzeonline.be - Available in Dutch
Official website - Available in Dutch, French, German and English
Local radio station website 

 
Municipalities of East Flanders
Populated places in East Flanders